Mount Lewis is the highest peak in the Shoshone Range in Lander County, Nevada, United States.  It is the most topographically prominent peak in Lander County and the twentieth-most prominent peak in Nevada. The peak is located about 14 miles southeast of the town of Battle Mountain. An FAA Long Range Air Route Surveillance Radar station is located just west of the summit. The peak is on public land administered by the Bureau of Land Management and thus has no access restrictions.

Summit panorama

References

Lewis
Lewis